Xavier Mbuyamba (born 31 December 2001) is a Dutch professional footballer who plays as a centre-back for Eredivisie club Volendam.

Mbuyamba made his professional debut for MVV Maastricht in 2018 and became the club's youngest-ever debutant, before moving to FC Barcelona the following year. After a season in Spain, he joined Premier League side Chelsea where he has continued his progression with the club's development side. He left Chelsea on a permanent deal on September 1, 2022 to join Eredivisie side, FC Volendam. He is also a Dutch youth international and has represented the Netherlands U19 team since 2019, although he remains eligible to represent DR Congo through descent.

Club career

MVV Maastricht

Early life & career

Mbuyamba was born in Maastricht, Netherlands to a Congolese father and Dutch mother and is one of four brothers born from the relationship. He hails from a sporting family and his older brother, Nathan, plays in the lower leagues in the Dutch system while his younger brother, Jeannot, is a budding goalkeeper. His other sibling, Noah, is an aspirant Paralympic sprinter. Mbuyamba started his footballing career with amateur clubs VV de Heeg and VV Scharn before joining the development structures of MVV Maastricht at the age of nine. There, he rapidly progressed through the club's academy and, upon making his senior debut against FC Volendam in the Eerste Divisie in November 2018, he became the club's youngest-ever player at the age of 16 years, 10 months and nine days. He ultimately made 11 league appearances for Maastricht throughout the season and his performances reportedly attracted attention from a host of European clubs, including the likes of Bayern Munich, Chelsea, Liverpool and Real Madrid. Mbuyamba was later invited to trial with Chelsea and was only prevented a move to London due to the club's transfer ban at the time, before electing instead to sign his first professional contract with Barcelona.

Barcelona
Having previously only signed a youth agreement with Maastricht, Mbuyamba turned down a three-year professional contract offer from the club in 2019 in favour of a move to La Liga side Barcelona. The move came about following an approach from Barça's academy director and former Netherlands international Patrick Kluivert, and saw him become the fourth  Dutch player to join the Catalan side ahead of the 2019–20 season following the club's earlier acquisitions of Frenkie de Jong, Ludovit Reis and Mike van Beijnen. Mbuyamba initially teamed up with the club's under-19 team where he played as both a right-back and centre-back throughout the season, representing the side in the UEFA Youth League, before earning the chance to train with the first team and feature in the match day squad during Barcelona B's 2–0 win against Ejea in January 2020.

Chelsea
After reaching an agreement for his release from Barcelona in June, Mbuyamba joined Premier League side Chelsea on 20 August 2020 on a three-year deal. However, soon after his arrival in London he suffered a torn meniscus injury which required surgery and which ultimately saw him sidelined for the majority of the season. After a period of eight months of rehabilitation, he made his debut for the club's development side on 11 April 2021 as a late substitute and marked his return to action with a goal as Chelsea recorded a 3-1 win over Southampton U23.

Volendam
On 1 September 2022, Mbuyamba returned to the Netherlands to join newly-promoted, Volendam on a three-year deal for an undisclosed fee.

International career
Mbuyamba is a Dutch youth international and made his debut for the Netherlands U19 team in November 2019 when he started and played the whole match in a 3–3 friendly draw against Mexico However, despite representing his country of birth, he remains eligible to play for DR Congo through descent as his father was born in the African country.

Style of play

Mbuyamba is a tall, athletic right-footed central defender who enjoys playing with the ball at his feet and is equally as strong in the air. Due to his height, physical stature, aerial presence and proficiency on the ball, the latter of which has been accredited to his development at La Masia, he has often been compared to countryman Virgil van Dijk during the early stages of his career. While ordinarily a centre-back by trade, he also possesses the versatility to slot in at right-back and was used on occasion in this role at Maastricht and Barcelona.

Career statistics

References

External links
 

2001 births
Footballers from Maastricht
Living people
Dutch footballers
Dutch people of Democratic Republic of the Congo descent
Association football forwards
FC Barcelona players
Chelsea F.C. players
MVV Maastricht players
FC Volendam players
Eerste Divisie players
Eredivisie players
Dutch expatriate footballers
Expatriate footballers in Spain
Dutch expatriate sportspeople in Spain
Expatriate footballers in England
Dutch expatriate sportspeople in England